The Sri Lanka thrush or Sri Lanka scaly thrush (Zoothera imbricata) is a member of the thrush family Turdidae. This bird is a non-migratory resident breeder found in south western rainforests of the island of Sri Lanka.

Zoothera imbricata was formerly treated as a race of the scaly thrush. It belongs in a group, possibly a superspecies, formed by that species and Z. lunulata, Z. heinei, Z. machiki, Z. talaseae, Z. margaretae etc., Z. imbricata being smaller, longer billed and rufous below.

References

External links
In Internet Bird Collection

Birds described in 1854
Birds of Sri Lanka
Endemic fauna of Sri Lanka
Zoothera
Taxobox binomials not recognized by IUCN